Yvonne Neuwirth (born 4 August 1992) is an Austrian tennis player.

She won one singles title and two doubles titles on the ITF Women's Circuit. On 14 July 2014, she reached her best singles ranking of world No. 305. On 18 May 2015, she peaked at No. 442 in the doubles rankings.

Neuwirth made her WTA Tour main-draw debut at the 2012 Gastein Ladies.

ITF finals

Singles: 7 (1 title, 6 runner–ups)

Doubles (2–5)

ITF Junior finals

Doubles (0–1)

References
 
 

1992 births
Living people
Sportspeople from Lower Austria
Austrian female tennis players